Chilkhaajavyn Avday (b. 1943) is a Mongolian engineer and politician. He is a member of the Mongolian Academy of Sciences.

Awards 
 People's Teacher of Mongolia
 Honorary degree (Mongolian University of Science and Technology)

References

Mongolian politicians
Mongolian engineers
People's Teacher of Mongolia
National University of Mongolia alumni
1943 births
Living people